The A2 motorway is a highway in Lithuania (Magistralinis kelias). It connects the capital city of Vilnius with Panevėžys, via Ukmergė.

It is a motorway for almost its whole length. The Vilnius - Ukmergė highway was the first section opened. Later, the highway was extended to Panevėžys.

There are in total six at-grade junctions with U-turns in this motorway. Five out of six of these junctions have automatic detecting systems with variable electronic road signs implemented which indicate a lower speed limit (usually 110 km/h instead of 130 km/h in summer time) if a U-turn or surrounding infrastructure is being used (excluding transit traffic of A2 highway). One section with an U-turn, but without this system has standard signs with the lowered speed limit of 110 km/h.  Agricultural vehicles cannot enter either the main road or the U-turns just to get to the other side since motorway signs are implemented near the junctions which restrict entry for any agricultural or slow vehicle.

The A2 highway has 4 lanes (two lanes each way) separated by a wide grass line and, in many parts, safety rails. The highway follows European route E272 for its entire length.

The most notable event in the highway was the peaceful political demonstration of the Baltic Way during the Singing Revolution in the late 1980s. Before early 1990s, the road was part of the Soviet Union's route signing system and was part of the Minsk-Vilnius-Riga highway M11.

References 

Roads in Lithuania